Sir Joseph Napier, 2nd Baronet (28 May 1841 – 13 November 1884) was an Irish Captain 23rd Royal Welch Fusiliers.

He was the son of Sir Joseph Napier, 1st Baronet and Charity (Cherry) Grace, and was born in Dublin, Ireland. His father was a leading politician and barrister who was briefly Lord Chancellor of Ireland in 1858–9. Joseph had an elder brother William, who died prematurely in 1874, to his parents' great grief.

He married Maria Octavier Mortimer on 10 November 1864 and had 2 sons: William Lennox Napier(1867-1915) and Joseph Duncan Mortimer Napier (1871-1900).

References
Ball, F. Elrington The Judges in Ireland 1221-1921 London John Murray 1926

Baronets in the Baronetage of the United Kingdom
1841 births
1884 deaths
Royal Welch Fusiliers officers
Military personnel from Dublin (city)